Henricus  was a bishop in Ireland during the early 14th century:  he was Bishop of Clogher  from 1310 until 1316.

References

14th-century Roman Catholic bishops in Ireland
Pre-Reformation bishops of Clogher
1316 deaths